Trey Ragas (born November 7, 1996) is an American football running back who is currently a free agent. He played college football at University of Louisiana at Lafayette.

Professional career

Las Vegas Raiders
Ragas signed with the Las Vegas Raiders as an undrafted free agent in 2021. He was waived on August 31, 2021, and re-signed to the practice squad the next day. He was promoted to the active roster on September 25, 2021. He was waived on September 27 and re-signed to the practice squad. Ragas made his NFL debut on December 12, 2021 in a game against the Kansas City Chiefs, collecting 15 yards on three totes. After the Raiders were eliminated in the 2021 Wild Card round of the playoffs, Ragas signed a reserve/future contract on January 17, 2022. He was waived on May 5, 2022.

Los Angeles Rams
On July 29, 2022, Ragas signed with the Los Angeles Rams. He was waived on August 30, 2022 and signed to the practice squad the next day. He was placed on the practice squad/injured list on September 15, 2022. He was released from the practice squad on September 22, 2022.

References

1996 births
Living people
American football running backs
Louisiana Ragin' Cajuns football players
Las Vegas Raiders players
Los Angeles Rams players